Bladimir Yovany Díaz Saavedra (born 10 July 1992) is a Colombian professional footballer who plays as a forward.

Club career

Chalatenango
After 34 goals for Chalatenango in the Segunda División de El Salvador, he scored 28 in 40 appearances in his first full season in the Salvadoran Primera División.

Díaz finished as the top scorer of the Clausura 2016 tournament, scoring 15 goals.

Alianza
Díaz signed with Alianza for the Apertura 2018 tournament. In November 2018, Díaz scored two goals in a 4–1 victory against Pasaquina at the Estadio Cuscatlán.

In December 2018, Alianza reached the Apertura 2018 final, its fifth consecutive final since the Apertura 2016. Díaz scored 7 goals during the Apertura 2018.

Alashkert
In June 2022, Díaz signed for Armenian Premier League club Alashkert alongside fellow Colombian Fabio Burbano. On 24 December 2022, Alashkert announced the departure of Díaz.

Al-Diriyah
On 27 December 2022, Díaz joined Saudi Arabian club Al-Diriyah; however, he was released from his contract three weeks later.

References

External links
 
 
 

1986 births
Living people
Colombian footballers
Real Santander footballers
Alianza Petrolera F.C. players
C.D. Chalatenango footballers
Alianza F.C. footballers
Bladimir Diaz
Comunicaciones F.C. players
Cobán Imperial players
C.D. FAS footballers
FC Alashkert players
Al-Diriyah Club players
Sektzia Ness Ziona F.C. players
Bladimir Diaz
Armenian Premier League players
Saudi Second Division players
Israeli Premier League players
Colombian expatriate footballers
Expatriate footballers in El Salvador
Expatriate footballers in Thailand
Expatriate footballers in Armenia
Expatriate footballers in Saudi Arabia
Expatriate footballers in Israel
Colombian expatriate sportspeople in El Salvador
Colombian expatriate sportspeople in Thailand
Colombian expatriate sportspeople in Armenia
Colombian expatriate sportspeople in Saudi Arabia
Colombian expatriate sportspeople in Israel
Association football forwards
People from Buenaventura, Valle del Cauca
Sportspeople from Valle del Cauca Department
21st-century Colombian people